Copestylum mexicanum, the Mexican cactus fly, is a species of syrphid fly in the family Syrphidae.

References

Further reading

External links

 Diptera.info

Eristalinae
Diptera of North America
Hoverflies of North America
Insects described in 1842
Taxa named by Pierre-Justin-Marie Macquart